The Dutch Fork is a region of South Carolina located in Lexington, Newberry, and Richland Counties between the Saluda River and the Broad River where they fork together, forming the Congaree River.  The area is named after the original German settlers of the area, and like the Pennsylvania Dutch, Dutch here is an Anglicization of the term deutsch (which means German in the German language). Initial settlement of the area was largely between 1730 and 1766 when the South Carolina government offered incentives for foreign Protestants to settle what was then the backcountry.

The Dutch Fork today
Unlike the Pennsylvania Dutch country, the use of a German dialect has not survived. The German-speaking settlers gave it its name "Dutch Fork", with Dutch meaning Deutsche (Germans). German heritage is preserved mainly in place and family names and the presence of a number of Lutheran churches, some dating back to the 18th century. Newberry is the only county in South Carolina with over 10% of its population being Lutheran. Dutch Fork Baptist Church was established in 1922. Dutch Fork High School, Dutch Fork Middle School, and Dutch Fork Elementary School are three of the nineteen schools of Lexington & Richland County School District Five which covers much of the Lexington and Richland County portion of the Dutch Fork. The Dutch Square Center shopping mall also alludes to the area in its name. The Dutch Fork cultivar of the China Rose (Rosa chinensis) was developed in the area.  Since 2005, a monthly newspaper, The Dutch Fork Chronicle, has been published in the area.

References

German-American history
German-American culture in South Carolina
Regions of South Carolina